Socket G2, also known as rPGA 988B is Intel's CPU socket used with their line of mobile Core i7, the successor to the Core 2 line, and also with several mobile Core i5 and Core i3 processors. It is based on Intel's Sandy Bridge and Ivy Bridge architecture. Like its predecessor, socket G1 systems, it can only run in dual-channel memory mode, but with data rates up to 1600 MHz (as opposed to the triple-channel mode which is unique to the LGA-1366 platform and subsequent Xeon sockets). Socket G2 CPUs are also known as FCPGA988 socket processors, which should be pin compatible with PPGA988.

Although nearly all motherboards using this socket are intended for mobile products like laptops, a few desktop boards using this do exist. Supermicro, for example, produced a number of mini ITX motherboards using the QM77 chipset.

Technical specifications
 Pins arranged in a 35×36 grid array (it is incompatible with G1 socket due to different placing of one pin)
 18×15 size grid removed from the center
 Utilization of cam-actuated retention mechanism
 The r in rPGA refers to reduced pitch which is 1mm × 1mm in this socket design.

rPGA 989 (as shown on the left) is a socket that can take Socket Socket G1 (rPGA988A) or Socket socket G2 (rPGA988B) processors.

Supported memory: 
DDR3 SoDIMM (1066-1333 MHz, Sandy Bridge); DDR3\DDR3L 1600 may work without DDR3L power optimisations and with 1333 MHz clock speed.
DDR3\DDR3L SoDIMM (1066-1600 MHz, Ivy Bridge).

See also
 List of Intel microprocessors
 Micro-FCPGA
 Socket G3
 Socket G1
 Socket P
 Socket M

References

External links
 http://www.designworldonline.com/articles/5444/154/Molex-Sockets-Earn-Intel--Validation.aspx
 ark.intel.com PGA988B search

Intel CPU sockets